is the Japanese debut single by South Korean–Japanese girl group Iz*One, a project group formed through the 2018 Mnet reality competition show Produce 48. It was released in Japan by EMI Records on February 6, 2019.

Promotion
Iz*One held their Japanese debut showcase at Tokyo Dome City Hall on January 20, 2019.

Music video 
The music video was released on January 25, 2019, and achieved more than 1.7 million views in the first 24 hours of its release on YouTube. It exceeded more than 5 million views within six days of its release.

Commercial performance 
"Suki to Iwasetai" debuted atop the daily ranking of the Oricon Singles Chart on its first day with 193,469 physical copies sold. With this, Iz*One also set the highest first day sales for a female Korean group, surpassing Twice's Wake Me Up. It ended up at no. 2 on the weekly Oricon Singles Chart with 221,640 units sold, while Billboard Japan recorded 303,745 sales from February 4–10, 2019.

Track listing 
Physical releases include DVDs with music videos for the title track and one B-side.

Charts

Certifications

References

Iz*One songs
2019 singles
2019 songs
Songs with lyrics by Yasushi Akimoto